Battle of Montuïc may refer to several historical battles including:

 Battle of Montjuïc (1641)
 Battle of Montjuïc (1705)